Edward H. Griffith (August 23, 1888 – March 3, 1975) (also known as E H Griffith, Lieut. Edward H. Griffith, Edward Griffith, and E. H. Griffith) was an American motion picture director, screenwriter, and producer.

Biography
Born in 1888 in Bloomington, Illinois, Griffith directed 61 films from 1917 to 1946. In 1917 he directedIn Love's Laboratory, a short for Thomas A. Edison, Inc.'s Conquest Pictures division about a man inventing safety matches and finding his relationship match. He directed actress Madeleine Carroll in several films including Honeymoon in Bali (1939). Griffith died on March 3, 1975, at the age of 86.

Filmography

Director

 The Law of the North (1917)
 Billy and the Big Stick (1917)
 Barnaby Lee (1917)
 The Awakening of Ruth (1917)
 One Touch of Nature (1917)
 Your Obedient Servant (1917)
 The End of the Road (1919)
Babs (1920)
 The Garter Girl (1920)
 The Vice of Fools (1920)
 If Women Only Knew (1921)
The Land of Hope (1921)
 Dawn of the East (1921)
 Scrambled Wives (1921)
 Free Air (1922)
Unseeing Eyes (1923)
 The Go-Getter (1923)
Week End Husbands (1924)
Another Scandal (1924)
Bad Company (1925)
 Headlines (1925)
White Mice (1926)
 Atta Boy (1926)
 Alias the Lone Wolf (1927)
 The Opening Night (1927)
Afraid to Love (1927)
 The Price of Honor (1927)
Captain Swagger (1928)
 The Shady Lady (1928)
Love Over Night (1928)
 Hold 'Em Yale (1928)
Paris Bound (1929)
 Rich People (1929)
Holiday (1930)
Beyond Victory (1931)
 Rebound (1931)
The Animal Kingdom (1932)
 Lady with a Past (1932)
 Another Language (1933)
Biography of a Bachelor Girl (1935), also producer
No More Ladies (1935), also producer
Next Time We Love (1936)
 Ladies in Love (1936)
Cafe Metropole (1937) 
 I'll Take Romance (1937)
Honeymoon in Bali (1939)
Cafe Society (1939)
 Safari (1940)
Virginia (1941)
Bahama Passage (1941)
 One Night in Lisbon (1941)
 Young and Willing (1943)
The Sky's the Limit (1943)
Perilous Holiday (1946)

Writer

 The Resurrection of Dan Packard (1916)
 The Last Sentence (1917)
 The Law of the North (1917)
 The End of the Road (1919)
 The Sea Raiders (1922)
 Alias the Lone Wolf (1927)
 The Opening Night (1927)
 The Shady Lady (1928)
 The Animal Kingdom (1932)
Virginia (1941)

References

External links

1888 births
1975 deaths
Writers from Lynchburg, Virginia
Burials at Forest Lawn Memorial Park (Glendale)
Film directors from Virginia